This article lists the results for the sport of Squash in 2019.

2018–19 PSA World Tour
World Squash Championships
 February 23 – March 2: World Squash Championships in  Chicago
 Men:  Ali Farag defeated  Tarek Momen, 11–5, 11–13, 13–11, 11–3.
 Women:  Nour El Sherbini defeated  Nour El Tayeb, 11–6, 11–5, 10–12, 15–13.

PSA World Tour Gold
 September 5 – 9, 2018: China Squash Open in  Shanghai
 Men:  Mohamed Abouelghar defeated  Paul Coll, 11–8, 11–8, 11–8.
 Women:  Raneem El Weleily defeated  Camille Serme, 11–5, 8–11, 11–6, 11–5.
 September 27 – October 2, 2018: Netsuite Open in  San Francisco
 Men:  Ali Farag defeated  Mohamed El Shorbagy, 11–9, 13–11, 4–11, 11–9.
 October 16 – 21: Channel VAS Championships at St George's Hill in  Weybridge
 Men:  Tarek Momen defeated  Ali Farag, 8–11, 11–8, 7–11, 11–5, 11–9.
 March 10 – 15: Canary Wharf Squash Classic in  London
 Men:  Paul Coll defeated  Tarek Momen, 11–8, 12–10, 11–3.
 March 11 – 15: Black Ball Squash Open in  Cairo
 Women:  Raneem El Weleily defeated  Nour El Sherbini, 9–11, 11–2, 6–11, 11–1, 11–5.
 March 26 – 31: Grasshopper Cup in  Zürich
 Men:  Mohamed El Shorbagy defeated  Tarek Momen, 11–8, 13–11, 11–8.
 April 9 – 14: DPD Open in  Eindhoven
 Men:  Ali Farag defeated  Mohamed El Shorbagy, 11–13, 11–6, 11–4, 11–4.
 Women:  Raneem El Weleily defeated  Nour El Sherbini, 10–12, 9–11, 11–8, 11–8, 11–8.

PSA World Tour Silver
 September 27 – October 2, 2018: Netsuite Open in  San Francisco
 Women:  Sarah-Jane Perry defeated  Raneem El Weleily, 11–9, 11–7, 9–11, 7–11, 11–7.
 January 8 – 12: CCI International in  Mumbai
 Men:  Tarek Momen defeated  Fares Dessouky, 11–7, 7–11, 12–10, 10–12, 11–7.
 January 29 – February 2: Motor City Open in  Detroit
 Men:  Mohamed Abouelghar defeated  Diego Elías, 5–11, 11–6, 11–3, 4–11, 11–8.
 March 3 – 7: Troilus Canada Cup in  Toronto
 Men:  Diego Elías defeated  Paul Coll, 11–8, 6–11, 11–8, 8–11, 11–7.

PSA World Tour Bronze
 October 17 – 22, 2018: Carol Weymuller Open in  Brooklyn Heights
 Women:  Nour El Tayeb defeated  Sarah-Jane Perry, 11–8, 10–12, 11–6, 11–8.
 November 10 – 14, 2018: QSF No.1 in  Doha
 Men:  Daryl Selby defeated  Omar Mosaad, 11–9, 11–6, 11–6.
 November 28 – December 2, 2018: Pakistan Open Squash Championships in  Karachi
 Men:  Karim Abdel Gawad defeated  Diego Elías, 11–4, 11–2, 11–8.
 January 30 – February 4: Cleveland Classic in  Cleveland
 Women:  Nour El Tayeb defeated  Tesni Evans, 11–5, 11–7, 9–11, 11–9.
 February 6 – 10: Pittsburgh Open in  Pittsburgh
 Men:  Grégoire Marche defeated  Zahed Salem, 11–9, 11–6, 10–12, 6–11, 11–5.
 March 26 – 31: Texas Open in  Dallas
 Women:  Amanda Sobhy defeated  Victoria Lust, 11–4, 11–2, 11–5.
 April 10 – 14: Macau Open in 
 Men:  Diego Elías defeated  Omar Mosaad, 11–3, 11–4, 11–9.
 Women:  Annie Au defeated  Low Wee Wern, 11–5, 13–11, 11–8.

PSA World Tour Platinum
 October 6 – 13, 2018: United States Open in  Philadelphia
 Men:  Mohamed El Shorbagy defeated  Simon Rösner, 8–11, 11–8, 6–11, 11–8, 11–4.
 Women:  Raneem El Weleily defeated  Nour El Sherbini, 11–6, 11–9, 11–8.
 October 27 – November 2, 2018: Qatar Classic in  Doha
 Men:  Ali Farag defeated  Simon Rösner, 11–9, 11–7, 11–5.
 November 19 – 25: Hong Kong Open in 
 Men:  Mohamed El Shorbagy defeated  Ali Farag, 11–6, 11–7, 11–7.
 Women:  Joelle King defeated  Raneem El Weleily, 11–4, 12–10, 19–17.
 December 3 – 9, 2018: Black Ball Squash Open in  Cairo
 Men:  Karim Abdel Gawad defeated  Ali Farag, 11–6, 13–11, 7–11, 11–8.
 January 16 – 24: Tournament of Champions in  New York City
 Men:  Ali Farag defeated Mohamed El Shorbagy, 10–12, 6–11, 11–6, 11–3, 11–8.
 Women:  Nour El Sherbini defeated  Raneem El Weleily, 11–9, 11–8, 11–8.

World and Continental Championships
 January 16 – 20: Asian Junior Teams Championships in  Pattaya
 Men's:  Pakistan (Abbas Zeb, Haris Qasim, Muhammad Farhan Hashmi) defeated  India (Utkarsh Baheti, Yash Fadte, Veer Chotrani), 2–0.
 Women's:  Malaysia (Aifa Azman, Chan Yiwen, Ooi Kah Yan) defeated  Hong Kong (Chan Sin-yuk, Cheng Nga-ching, Cheng Nga Ching), 2–0.
 April 3 – 6: European Squash Team Championships (Division 3) in  Lisbon
 Men's:  Poland (Adam Pełczyński, Adrian Marszał, Piotr Hemmerling, Jakub Pytlowany) defeated  Austria (Jakob Dirnberger, Marcus Greslehner, Lukas Windischberger, Paul Mairinger), after points.
 Women's:  Russia (Ekaterina Marusan, Alesya Aleshina, Varvara Esina) defeated  Austria (Birgit Coufal, Jacqueline Peychär, Sandra Polak), 2–1.
 April 13 – 21: U19 Individuals and Team Championships in  Prague
 May 1 – 4: European Squash Team Championships (Divisions 1 & 2) in  Birmingham
 May 1 – 5: 2019 Men's Asian Individual Squash Championships in  Kuala Lumpur
 May 9 – 12: U15 & U17 Individuals and Team Championships in  Eindhoven
 June 26 – 30: Asian Junior Squash Individual Championships in 
 August 21 – 24: European Masters Individual Championships in  Vienna
 September 6 – 10: 2019 Men's European Individual Closed Championships in  Bucharest
 September 19 – 22: European Club Championships in  Edinburgh

References

External links
 World Squash: official website of the World Squash Federation

 
Squash by year
2019 sport-related lists